State Route 55 (SR 55) is a  state highway that runs south-to-north through portions of Calhoun and Terrell counties in the southwestern part of the U.S. state of Georgia. It connects the Leary and Dawson areas of the state.

Route description
SR 55 begins at an intersection with SR 37/SR 62 in Leary, in Calhoun County. It heads northeast on Mercer Avenue, before traveling to the north on Bray Street. It travels northeast, through rural sections of the county. The highway passes the Spring Creek Cemetery. Just over  after intersecting SR 234, the route crosses into Terrell County. The highway continues to the north until it meets its northern terminus, an intersection with US 82/SR 520 in Dawson.

A largely rural route, State Route 55 sees an Average Annual Daily Traffic of less than 2,000 vehicles.

History

SR 55 used to continue north, into Cusseta, along what is now US 82/SR 520, but was superseded, and thus replaced, upon the commissioning of US 82/SR 520.

Major intersections

Cusseta business loop

State Route 55 Business (SR 55 Bus.) was a business loop of SR 55 that existed entirely within the city of Cusseta. It followed Broad Street through the city.

SR 55 Bus. was established in 1972, when the road that is now SR 520 was established as part of SR 55. In 1988, the same year that SR 520 was designated in Georgia, and SR 55 was decommissioned, SR 55 Bus. was redesignated as SR 520 Bus.

See also

References

External links

 Georgia Roads (Routes 41 - 60)

055
Transportation in Calhoun County, Georgia
Transportation in Terrell County, Georgia